Sculpture could be found at the 1893 World's Columbian Exposition in various different places and serving a diverse number of functions.  The works displayed in the specially designed sculpture exhibition halls tended to be by the better known artists of the day but the visitors to the Expo did not need to enter the buildings to find sculpture.   The grounds, especially around the lagoon areas and decorating the various bridges were liberally sprinkled with sculpture, most of it made out of staff, an impermanent material. Also to be found were a number of fountains. Another form of sculpture at the Fair, also made of staff, was the architectural sculpture that adorned a large number of the buildings.

Architectural sculpture
But here it might be well to say something of the material of which they are constructed, the new and wonderful "staff." It has the properties of both common plaster and cement, and can be worked into any required design; in hardening it shows an ivory-like surface, which, however, can be colored in any desired tint. Thus the most ornate architectural effects are produced, and all the buildings, being covered with this decorative substance, present the appearance of veritable palaces. For the designs, etc., it is modeled into plates the required size and joined invisibly, and it is estimated that about 500,000 of these pieces have been used in the large buildings alone.

Sixteen bridges spanned the lagoons that meandered through the fairgrounds. Four statues of native American mammals, also made of staff, decorated the piers at each end of a bridge.

The sculptors and their works

See also
 List of American painters exhibited at the 1893 World's Columbian Exposition

References

 Carr, Carolyn Kinder, et al., Revisiting the White City: American Art at the 1893 World's Fair, National Portrait Gallery, Washington, D.C. 1993 pp. 356–383

World
World's Columbian Exposition
1893 in art
+
American
American sculptors exhibited at the 1893 World's Columbian Exposition